Afroparaclius is a genus of flies in the family Dolichopodidae. It includes two species from Africa formerly placed in Paracleius (which is now a synonym of Pelastoneurus).

Species
 Afroparaclius didyensis (Grichanov, 2004)
 Afroparaclius thompsoni (Grichanov, 2004)

References

Dolichopodidae genera
Dolichopodinae
Diptera of Africa